Believe Me is a 2014 American independent comedy-drama film directed by Will Bakke, co-written with Michael B. Allen, and produced by Alex Carroll. The film stars Alex Russell, Zachary Knighton, Johanna Braddy, Miles Fisher, Sinqua Walls, Max Adler, with Nick Offerman, and Christopher McDonald.

Plot 
Smart, handsome, and charming, there is no one who could say no to college senior Sam. But when a surprise tuition bill leaves him thousands of dollars in the hole, Sam is forced to think outside the box. Convincing his three roommates they can make a killing exploiting the gullible church crowd, the guys start a sham charity and begin campaigning across the country, raising funds for a cause as fake as their message. But when sweet tour manager Callie, the object of Sam's affections, discovers their ruse, it's Sam's moment, alone in the spotlight, to decide what he really believes.

Cast 
 Alex Russell as Sam
 Zachary Knighton as Gabriel
 Johanna Braddy as Callie
 Miles Fisher as Pierce
 Sinqua Walls as Tyler
 Max Adler as Baker
 Nick Offerman as Sean
 Christopher McDonald as Ken
 Lecrae as Dr. Darnall Malmquist

Production 
Believe Me is the feature film debut from Riot Studios, producers of One Nation Under God and Beware of Christians. The film is directed by Will Bakke, who also co-wrote the screenplay with Michael B. Allen, and produced by Alex Carroll. John W. Rutland is the director of photography. Rapper Lecrae was added as a featured cast member alongside rising Australian star, Alex Russell who is playing the lead role.

The film was released on September 26, 2014, in Theaters and On Demand.

The filming of the dramatic comedy began on August 5, 2013, in Austin, Texas and was completed in 20 days.

References

External links 
 
 
 

2014 films
Films shot in Austin, Texas
American comedy-drama films
Films about Christianity
Films about evangelicalism
Films about religion
American independent films
2014 directorial debut films
2014 comedy-drama films
2014 independent films
2010s English-language films
2010s American films